Ron Esau (October 9, 1954 – January 24, 2022) was a NASCAR Winston Cup Series driver who competed from 1975 to 1990.

Career
The primary vehicle for this driver was the No. 56 Marc Reno-owned Gear Vendor Chevrolet. Esau started in an average of 31st place and finished in an average of 30th place; keeping him near the rear of the average racing grid. His total career earnings are $44,290.

Even though he acquired a 17-race winless streak throughout his entire career as a NASCAR driver, Esau climbed as high in the championship rankings to 62nd place in the 1984 NASCAR Winston Cup Series season in addition to falling as low as 114th place in the 1986 NASCAR Winston Cup Series championship standings.

Since 2013, Esau has operated a racing team in the independent circuits of stock cars that feature the old V8 engines that are rarely used in major league motorsports anymore.

Personal life and death
Esau was married to Marsha; they had one son. He worked as a mentor to young stock car drivers like Brandon Whitt and Brendan Gaughan. Occasional jobs that Esau did after his NASCAR career include stints as the head driving instructor for Drivetech Racing School and doing fundraisers for people with various handicaps. Ron died on January 24, 2022, at the age of 67.

Motorsports career results

NASCAR
(key) (Bold – Pole position awarded by qualifying time. Italics – Pole position earned by points standings or practice time. * – Most laps led.)

Winston Cup Series

Daytona 500

Craftsman Truck Series

Winston West Series

ARCA Hooters SuperCar Series
(key) (Bold – Pole position awarded by qualifying time. Italics – Pole position earned by points standings or practice time. * – Most laps led.)

References

External links

1954 births
2022 deaths
21st-century American businesspeople
Sportspeople from San Diego County, California
Racing drivers from California
NASCAR drivers
Businesspeople from California
People from Lakeside, California
ARCA Menards Series drivers